Yusong Foot Spa is a public natural hot spring located in an urban park in Yuseong-gu, a district of Daejeon Metropolitan City, South Korea. The foot spa is open year-round and is free to the public. The park features fountains, streams, colorful lighting, a water wheel, and a vending machine for towels, and is well frequented by locals.

According to the Korean language information at the site, the Yusong Foot Spa opened October 5, 2007. Parts of the bottom are lined with smooth rock and pebble to provide a foot massage to those strolling through the water. A gazebo covers one end of the wading pool.

The spring water in Yeusong Hot Spring originate from between 215 and 450 meters deep, are soft and mildly alkaline (pH 7.5 to 8.5) with a high mineral concentration including silicate (SiO2), known for softening the skin. The water temperature is also relatively high, ranging from 41 degrees to 57 degrees Celsius.

See also
 List of hot springs

References

Geography of Korea
Hot springs of South Korea
2007 establishments in South Korea
Yuseong District